Michael J. Flores is an American author on the topic of games, Magic: The Gathering, deck construction and game theory.

Career
The Philippines-born Flores has published articles for The Duelist, The Sideboard, Usenet, The Magic Dojo, The Psylum Dojo, Neutral Ground, Brainburst and other major independent Magic sites. He used to write a weekly column for Wizards of the Coast's official site MagicTheGathering.com and occasional columns for MTG site Starcitygames.com.

Flores is a former color commentator on the Pro Tour webcasts.

Flores designed Jon Finkel's deck, Napster, for the 2000 US National Championship. He also designed André Coimbra's Naya Lightsaber deck, which he used to win the 2009 World Championship.

Flores has qualified for the Pro Tour numerous times. He has earned the nickname "Bad Player Flores" due to his continued failure to succeed at the top level of the game as well as his many play mistakes. However, he did finish 26th at Pro Tour Charleston with teammates Steve Sadin and Paul Jordan, with an individual record of 11-3, and won the 2006 Standard State Championship in New York City

The first 10 years of Flores' writing were recently collected into a book called Michael J. Flores: Deckade, 10 years of decks, thoughts and theory. He is currently working on a graphic novel with Platinum Studios.

References

Living people
American Magic: The Gathering players
Writers from New York City
Year of birth missing (living people)